New York's 142nd State Assembly district is one of the 150 districts in the New York State Assembly. It has been represented by Patrick B. Burke since 2019.

Geography 
District 142 is in Erie County. It contains South Buffalo, the City of Lackawanna, and the towns of West Seneca and Orchard Park.

Recent election results

2020

2018

2018 special

2016

2014

2012

References

142
Erie County, New York